There have been three baronetcies created for members of the Shelley family, one in the Baronetage of England and two in the Baronetage of the United Kingdom. The three recipients of the titles represented two different branches of the family with a common ancestor in John Shelley of Michelgrove (died 1526). The most famous member of the family is the poet Percy Bysshe Shelley, although he never held any title. The holders of the third and last creation were later elevated to the peerage as Baron De L'Isle and Dudley and Viscount De L'Isle.

Shelley of Michelgrove

The Shelley Baronetcy, of Michelgrove in the County of Sussex, was created in the Baronetage of England on 22 May 1611 for John Shelley. The fourth Baronet represented Arundel and Lewes in the House of Commons while the fifth Baronet sat as a Member of Parliament for East Retford and Newark. Furthermore, the sixth Baronet represented Helston and Lewes and the seventh Baronet Gatton, Grimsby and Westminster. Their seat after 1880 was Shobrooke Park, near Crediton in Devon, which had been inherited by Sir John Shelley from his cousin John Henry Tuckfield (d.1880), Sheriff of Devon in 1859. It was formerly called Little Fulford and was destroyed by fire whilst serving as a boys' school in 1945.

Shelley of Castle Goring
The Shelley Baronetcy, of Castle Goring in the County of Sussex, was created in the Baronetage of the United Kingdom on 3 March 1806 for Bysshe Shelley [1731 – 1815]. Sir Bysshe Shelley was succeeded by his eldest son, Timothy, from his first marriage. Upon his death, Sir Timothy became the second Baronet. His eldest son and heir apparent was the poet Percy Bysshe Shelley. Percy Bysshe Shelley died before his father, leaving two sons: Charles Bysshe Shelley by his first wife Harriet Westbrook, and Percy Florence Shelley, Shelley's son from his second marriage to the author Mary Shelley. Upon the death of Sir Timothy, Percy Florence Shelley became the third Baronet. However, he died childless and the title passed to his first cousin, Edward Shelley, who then became the fourth Baronet.

Sir Bysshe Shelley had one son from his second marriage, John Shelley. His name was changed to Shelley-Sidney in 1795. He was created a Baronet, of Penshurst Place, in 1818 (see below).

Edward Shelley was the son of John Shelley, the second son of Sir Timothy Shelley. On his death in 1890 the title passed to his younger brother, Lt.-Col. Sir Charles Shelley, the fifth Baronet. He was succeeded by his son, Sir John Courtown Edward Shelley-Rolls, the sixth Baronet. Sir John married the Hon. Eleanor Georgiana Rolls, daughter of the 1st Baron Llangattock, and in 1917 they assumed the additional surname and arms of Rolls. When he died the title passed to his younger brother, Sir Percy Bysshe Shelley, the seventh Baronet. On Sir Percy's death in 1965 this line of the family failed and the title was inherited by the late Baronet's kinsman, William Sidney, 1st Viscount De L'Isle, who became the 9th Baronet of Castle Goring as well. For further history of the title, see the Viscount De L'Isle.

Shelley of Penshurst Place
The Shelley-Sidney Baronetcy, of Penshurst Place in the County of Kent, was created in the Baronetage of the United Kingdom on 12 December 1818 for John Shelley-Sidney. He was the only son from the second marriage of the first Baronet of the 1806 creation (see above). For more information on this creation see the Viscount De L'Isle.

Shelley baronets, of Michelgrove (1611)
Sir John Shelley, 1st Baronet (died )
Sir Charles Shelley, 2nd Baronet (died 1681) (grandson)
Sir John Shelley, 3rd Baronet (died 1703) (son)
Sir John Shelley, 4th Baronet (1692–1771) (son)
Sir John Shelley, 5th Baronet (c. 1730–1783) (son)
Sir John Shelley, 6th Baronet (1772–1852) (son)
Sir John Villiers Shelley, 7th Baronet (1808–1867) (eldest son)
Sir Frederic Shelley, 8th Baronet (1809–1869) (younger brother)
Sir John Shelley, 9th Baronet (1848–1931)
Sir John Frederick Shelley, 10th Baronet (1884–1976)
Sir John Richard Shelley, 11th Baronet (born 1943)

The heir presumptive is the present holder's brother Thomas Henry Shelley (born 1945).

Shelley baronets, of Castle Goring (1806)
Sir Bysshe Shelley, 1st Baronet (1731–1815)
Sir Timothy Shelley, 2nd Baronet (1753–1844)
Percy Bysshe Shelley (1792–1822)
Sir Percy Florence Shelley, 3rd Baronet (1819–1889)
John Shelley (1806–1866)
Sir Edward Shelley, 4th Baronet (1827–1890)
Sir Charles Shelley, 5th Baronet (1838–1902)
Sir John Courtown Edward Shelley-Rolls, 6th Baronet (1871–1951)
Sir Percy Bysshe Shelley, 7th Baronet (1872–1953)
Sir Sidney Patrick Shelley, 8th Baronet (1880–1965)
William Sidney, 1st Viscount De L'Isle, 7th Baronet of Penshurst Place and 9th Baronet of Castle Goring (1909–1991), descended from the third son of the first baronet.
see Viscount De L'Isle for further holders

Shelley Sidney, later Sidney baronets, of Penshurst Place (1818)
see the Viscount De L'Isle

See also
Castle Goring
Penshurst Place

Notes

References 
Kidd, Charles, Williamson, David (editors). Debrett's Peerage and Baronetage (1990 edition). New York: St Martin's Press, 1990, 

Obituary The Times 21 February 1951; Issue 51931
 

 

Baronetcies in the Baronetage of England
Baronetcies in the Baronetage of the United Kingdom
1611 establishments in England
Noble titles created in 1611